Nabiollah Bagheriha (born June 15, 1979) is an Iranian football defender who currently plays for Sanat Naft in Iran's Premier Football League.

Club career
After joining Persepolis, everyone thought that he was just going to be a backup that played in the easy matches but toward the end of the 2007–08 season when Mohammad Nosrati was moved from the centre-back position to the left-back position, Bagheriha was placed in the starting line up for important matches.

During the 2008–09 season he became a starter for many games and was placed in the line up for important matches against many rivals and even in the AFC Champions League.

Club Career Statistics
Last update:  3 August 2011 

 Assist Goals

Honours

Iran's Premier Football League
Winner: 1
2007/08 with Persepolis
Hazfi Cup
Winner: 1
2009/10 with Persepolis

External links
Profile at Persianleague.com

Iranian footballers
Association football defenders
Persepolis F.C. players
Tractor S.C. players
People from Tehran
1979 births
Living people
Sanat Mes Kerman F.C. players
Shahrdari Tabriz players